The Martin High School is a coeducational secondary school with academy status, located in the village of Anstey, Leicestershire, on the outskirts of Leicester. The school accepts students from nearby Beaumont Leys, Glenfield, Thurcaston and Cropston as well as some students from New Parks and Braunstone.

The school has won awards such as The Healthy Schools Award and in its most recent Ofsted inspection the school was graded "Good".

History 
The Martin High School was founded in 1957 and was named after Sir Robert Martin, Chairman of the Leicester County Council, in honor of his public service.

Originally a Secondary Modern school for pupils aged 11 to 16, then a middle school for 11 - 14 ages, in September 2013 The Martin High School became, again, a secondary school for pupils aged 11 to 16. The first school GCSE results were received in 2015.

Notable former pupils 
Daniel Greaves
Willie Thorne

References

External links

Academies in Leicestershire
Borough of Charnwood
Educational institutions established in 1957
Secondary schools in Leicestershire
1957 establishments in England